Guatemala first participated at the Olympic Games in 1952, but then missed the next three Olympiads. Guatemala has sent athletes to compete in every Summer Olympic Games since 1968.  The nation has participated in the Winter Olympic Games once, in 1988.

Guatemala won its first Olympic medal sixty years after its first Olympic appearance, during the 2012 Summer Olympics, when Érick Barrondo took second place in the men's 20 km walk. This makes Guatemala notable as one of the few countries with more Nobel laureates than Olympic medalists.

The National Olympic Committee for Guatemala was created in 1947 and recognized by the International Olympic Committee that same year.

Medal tables

Medals by Summer Games

Medals by Winter Games

Medals by sport

List of medalists

See also
 :Category:Olympic competitors for Guatemala
 List of flag bearers for Guatemala at the Olympics
 Tropical nations at the Winter Olympics
 Guatemala at the Paralympics

References

External links